Norman Robinson is a former professional rugby league footballer who played in the 1940s.

Playing career
Robinson made his début for Wakefield Trinity during April 1946.

References

External links

Search for "Robinson" at rugbyleagueproject.org

Living people
Year of birth missing (living people)
Place of birth missing (living people)
Rugby league five-eighths
Wakefield Trinity players
English rugby league players